Chapelton v Barry Urban District Council [1940] 1 KB 532, the "deckchair case", is an English contract law case on offer and acceptance and exclusion clauses. It stands for the proposition that a display of goods can be an offer and a whole offer, rather than an invitation to treat, and serves as an example for how onerous exclusion clauses can be deemed to not be incorporated in a contract.

Facts
David Chapelton went to a beach with his friend, Miss Andrews, at Cold Knap, a district of Barry in south Wales. There was a pile of deckchairs. A notice next to them said,

It also said tickets should be obtained from attendants. Mr Chapelton took two chairs from an attendant, paid the money and received two tickets. He put them in his pocket. On the tickets was written,

When Mr Chapelton sat on the chair it gave way, the canvas tearing from the top of the chair. He was injured. The county court judge held the council would have been negligent but that liability was exempted by the ticket. Mr Chapelton appealed.

Judgment
The Court of Appeal upheld Mr Chapelton's claim, overturning the judgment at first instance; it held that there was a valid offer when the chairs were on display, accepted when picked up the chairs from the defendant. Therefore, the ticket was merely a receipt of the contract, and the exclusion clause could not be incorporated as a term, because it was too late. Slesser LJ read the facts and gave his judgment first.

See also

Pharmaceutical Society of Great Britain v. Boots Cash Chemists (Southern) Ltd.

Notes

English incorporation case law
English unfair terms case law
Court of Appeal (England and Wales) cases
1940 in British law
1940 in case law
Barry, Vale of Glamorgan
20th century in Glamorgan